The river Chimenticook is a tributary of the Saint John River (Bay of Fundy), flowing in the canton T13 R13 Wels, in the Aroostook County, in North of Maine, in United States.

Its course is in forest area in a valley enclosed by high mountains, in the southeast of the US border. Its course is situated between the river Powock (northeast side) and "Twomile Brook" (West side).

The river side of the river is accessible by Chimenticook some forest roads.

Geography 

The upper part of the "River Chimenticook" begins in Notre Dame Mountains at the mouth of the East Lake in Aroostook County (Maine). This Canadian lake surrounded by mountains has two parts connected by a strait, and only  of its length (southeast part) is in American territory. This lake is mainly fed by the River Spikes (Kamouraska) (from the West) and the "ruisseau Blanc" (White Brook) (coming from the North).

The mouth of the East Lake flows through the southeast and is located at:

  southeast of the border between Quebec and Maine;
  northwest from the confluence of the river Chimenticook;
  southeast of the Route 132 at La Pocatiere, Quebec, in Quebec.

  to the South, to the northwest shore of the "Little East Lake";
  to the Southeast through the "Little East Lake" up at its mouth located in the Southeast;
  to the Southeast, to the deck of a forest road;
  to the Southeast, to the deck of a forest road;
  to the Southeast, to the confluence of the river.

The "Chimenticook River" flows into a river curve on the north shore of Saint John River, Canton T16 R13 Wels, the Aroostook County. This confluence is located at:

  West of the Allagash hamlet, located on the south shore of St. John River;
  upstream of the confluence of the river Pocwock;
  downstream of the confluence of the Big Black River.

Toponymy 
The term "Chimenticook" is original Abenaki.

See also 

Mount Carmel, a municipality of Quebec
Kamouraska Regional County Municipality (RCM)
Aroostook County, a county Maine
Rivière aux Pointes (Kamouraska) (Spikes River)
List of rivers of Quebec
List of rivers of Maine

References

External links 
 
 Maine Streamflow données de l'USGS
 Maine Watershed données à partir de l'Environmental Protection Agency

Tributaries of the Saint John River (Bay of Fundy)
Rivers of Aroostook County, Maine
North Maine Woods